Rolf Jelinek (born 28 August 1936) is a Swiss middle-distance runner. He competed in the men's 800 metres at the 1964 Summer Olympics.

References

1936 births
Living people
Athletes (track and field) at the 1964 Summer Olympics
Swiss male middle-distance runners
Olympic athletes of Switzerland
Place of birth missing (living people)